Mickey Levy (born 21 June 1951) is an Israeli politician who currently serves as a member of the Knesset for Yesh Atid and is a former Speaker of the Knesset. He served as Deputy Minister of Finance between 2013 and 2014. Before entering politics, he was a police officer.

Biography
Levy was born in Jerusalem to immigrant parents who were Sephardic and Kurdish Jewish origin from Cizre, Turkey. He did his military service in the Israel Defense Forces in the Paratroopers Brigade. After being discharged from the military, he joined the Israel Police and held a series of command positions. He served as head of Jerusalem branch of the Israel Police between 2000 and 2004, winning the Knight of Good Government award in 2002. After retiring he worked as the Israeli police attaché in Washington, D.C. until 2007. He also gained a BA in political science from the University of Haifa and an MEd from the University of Derby, as well as serving as CEO of the Egged Ta'avura bus company.

Prior to the 2013 Knesset elections Levy joined the new Yesh Atid party, and was placed eleventh on its list. He entered the Knesset after the party won 19 seats. Following Yesh Atid's coalition agreement with Likud, he was appointed to serve as Deputy Finance Minister. He was placed eleventh on the party's list again for the 2015 elections, and was re-elected as the party won 11 seats.

In the build-up to the April 2019 elections Yesh Atid joined the Blue and White alliance, with Levy placed twenty-second on its list. He was re-elected as the alliance won 35 seats. 

As part of the agreement between Naftali Bennett and Yair Lapid to form a "change" government, Levy was elected Speaker of the 24th Knesset on 13 June 2021, defeating Ya'akov Margi of Shas. Following the 2022 elections Levy was replaced as speaker by Yariv Levin.

Personal life
Levy is married to Nurit and has four children and lives in the Mevasseret Zion suburb of Jerusalem.

References

External links

1951 births
Living people
Alumni of the University of Derby
Blue and White (political alliance) politicians
Deputy ministers of Israel
Israeli businesspeople
Israeli Jews
Israeli people of Kurdish-Jewish descent
Israeli police officers
Jewish Israeli politicians
Members of the 19th Knesset (2013–2015)
Members of the 20th Knesset (2015–2019)
Members of the 21st Knesset (2019)
Members of the 22nd Knesset (2019–2020)
Members of the 23rd Knesset (2020–2021)
Members of the 24th Knesset (2021–2022)
Members of the 25th Knesset (2022–)
Politicians from Jerusalem
Speakers of the Knesset
University of Haifa alumni
Yesh Atid politicians